Olochi is a rural locality (a selo) and the administrative center and only settlement of Olochinskoye Rural Settlement of Nerchinsko-Zavodsky District, Zabaykalsky Krai, in Far East Russia. It is located on the left bank of the Argun river,  from the village of Nerchinsky Zavod. Population:

References 

Rural localities in Zabaykalsky Krai